Chin chin is a fried snack in West Africa.

Chin Chin or variants may also refer to:

Arts and entertainment
 Chin Chin (album), by Skunkhour, 1997
 "Chin chin el teporocho" 1976 film directed by Gabriel Retes.
 Chin-Chin, a 1914–15 Broadway musical starring David C. Montgomery and Fred Stone  
 Qinqin, a plucked Chinese lute
 Tchin-Tchin, also known as Chin-Chin, a 1959 French romantic comedy play 
 Chinchin, a fictional character in the film Sixteen Fathoms Deep
 Chin Chinchin, a Toriko character
 Chinchin, metallic rattles used by Parachico dancers
 "Chinny chin chin", a phrase from The Three Little Pigs fable

Places
 Chinchin, a village in Armenia
 Chinchin, a hamlet of Astis, France
 Chinchin, an administrative division of Jasin District, Malaysia 
 Chinchin, a river in Chile

Other uses
 "Chin chin" or variants in different languages, a drinking toast
 Chin Chin Gutierrez (born 1969), Filipino actress and environmentalist
 "Chinchin", a Japanese word for penis (similar to "Willy" in English)

See also